The 1971 VII FIBA International Christmas Tournament "Trofeo Raimundo Saporta" was the 7th edition of the FIBA International Christmas Tournament. It took place at Sports City of Real Madrid Pavilion, Madrid, Spain, on 24, 25 and 26 December 1971 with the participations of Real Madrid (champions of the 1970–71 Liga Española de Baloncesto), North Carolina Tar Heels, Juventud Schweppes (runners-up of the 1970–71 Copa del Rey de Baloncesto) and Unión Española.

League stage

Day 1, December 24, 1971

|}

Day 2, December 25, 1971

|}

Day 3, December 26, 1971

|}

Final standings

References

1971–72 in European basketball
1971–72 in Spanish basketball